The following lists events that happened during 1948 in New Zealand.

Population
 Estimated population as of 31 December: 1,853,900
 Increase since 31 December 1947: 36,400 (2.00%)
 Males per 100 females: 100.5

Incumbents

Regal and viceregal
Head of State – George VI
Governor-General – Lieutenant-General The Lord Freyberg VC GCMG KCB KBE DSO

Government
The 28th New Zealand Parliament continued, with the Labour Party in government.

Speaker of the House – Robert McKeen (Labour)
Prime Minister – Peter Fraser
Minister of Finance – Walter Nash
Minister of Foreign Affairs – Peter Fraser
Attorney-General – Rex Mason
Chief Justice – Sir Humphrey O'Leary

Parliamentary opposition 
 Leader of the Opposition –  Sidney Holland (National Party).

Main centre leaders
Mayor of Auckland – John Allum
Mayor of Hamilton – Harold Caro
Mayor of Wellington – Will Appleton
Mayor of Christchurch – Ernest Andrews
Mayor of Dunedin – Donald Cameron

Events 

 31 May – Tea rationing, introduced in June 1942, is abolished.
 27 August – Sugar rationing, introduced in April 1942, is abolished.
 27 September – Meat rationing, introduced in March 1944, is abolished. Butter remains the sole food product still under rationing.
 The Marlborough Press, which was founded in 1860, is taken over by The Marlborough Express.
 Italy establishes a consulate in Wellington.

Arts and literature
See 1948 in art, 1948 in literature

Music
See: 1948 in music

Radio
See: Public broadcasting in New Zealand

Film
See: :Category:1948 film awards, 1948 in film, List of New Zealand feature films, Cinema of New Zealand, :Category:1948 films

Sport

Archery
The national championships are held at a single venue for the first time replacing the previous postal shoot.

National Champions
Open Men – H. Butel (Dunedin)
Open Women – D. Johnstone (Dunedin)

Athletics
 Jack Clarke wins the national title in the men's marathon, clocking 2:44:06 in Dunedin.

Basketball
Interpovincial Champions: Men – Palmerston North
Interpovincial Champions: Women – Palmerston North

Chess
 The 55th National Chess Championship was held in Dunedin, and was won by R.G. Wade of Wellington (his 3rd win).

Horse racing

Harness racing
 New Zealand Trotting Cup – Highland Fling (2nd win)
 Auckland Trotting Cup – Captain Sandy

Lawn bowls
The national outdoor lawn bowls championships are held in Dunedin.
 Men's singles champion – S. Marriott (Opawa Bowling Club)
 Men's pair champions – M.A. Marinovich, S. Garelja (skip) (Oratia Bowling Club)
 Men's fours champions – J.W.T. Macklow, Frank Livingstone, Alec Robertson, J.H. Mingins (skip) (Onehunga Bowling Club)

Olympic Games

 New Zealand is represented by seven competitors in athletics, boxing, cycling, swimming and weightlifting. There are no medal successes.

Rugby union
:Category:Rugby union in New Zealand, :Category:All Blacks
 Ranfurly Shield

Rugby league
New Zealand national rugby league team

Soccer
 The Chatham Cup is won by Technical Old Boys of Christchurch who beat Waterside of Wellington 2–0 in the final.
 An Australian side toured New Zealand, playing four internationals:
 14 August, Wellington: NZ 0–6	Australia
 28 August, Christchurch: NZ 0–7	Australia
 4 September, Wellington: NZ 0–4	Australia
 11 September, Auckland: NZ 1–8	Australia
 Provincial league champions:
	Auckland:	Eastern Suburbs
	Canterbury:	Western
	Hawke's Bay:	Napier HSOB
	Nelson:	Nelson United
	Otago:	Mosgiel
	South Canterbury:	Fisherman
	Southland:	Invercargill United
	Taranaki:	Stratford
	Waikato:	Rotowaro
	Wanganui:	Wanganui Athletic
	Wellington:	Waterside

Births
 6 January: Dayle Hadlee, cricketer.
 16 January: Dalvanius Prime, entertainer.
 17 January: Billy T. James, comedian.
 7 February: Richard Prebble, politician.
 27 February: Michael Baigent, author and conspiracy theorist.
 2 April (in Scotland): Sam Malcolmson, soccer player.
 25 May: Mac Price, diplomat.
 3 July: Richard Worth, politician.
 22 July: Kevin Ryan, long-distance runner.
 29 July: John Clarke, actor, best known in New Zealand for Fred Dagg.
 6 September: Kevin Towns, field hockey player and coach.
 1 October: Peter Blake, yachtsman.
 2 October: Robert Anderson, cricketer.
 24 October: Ray Ahipene-Mercer, musician, politician.
 4 November: Alexis Hunter, painter.
 13 November: Lockwood Smith, politician.
 15 November: David Caygill, politician.
 Sue Kedgley, politician.
 Bruce Lynch, musician.
 Grahame Sydney, painter.
 Sue Wood, politician.

Deaths
 16 May: John Gordon Eliott, former Reform MP 
 16 June: Lavinia Jane Kelsey, kindergarten founder and teacher
 25 September: George Davidson, olympic sprinter.
 9 October: Edmund Anscombe, architect.
 20 December: Fanny Irvine-Smith, teacher and writer  
 21 December: Fred Bartram, former Labour MP

See also
History of New Zealand
List of years in New Zealand
Military history of New Zealand
Timeline of New Zealand history
Timeline of New Zealand's links with Antarctica
Timeline of the New Zealand environment

For world events and topics in 1948 not specifically related to New Zealand see: 1948

References

External links

 
Years of the 20th century in New Zealand